Marie Aurelle Awona (born 2 February 1993) is a Cameroonian professional footballer who plays as a defender for Portoguese club Braga. She previously played for Stade de Reims in the French Division 1 Féminine and plays at international level for the Cameroon women's national team.

Born in Yaoundé, Cameroon in 1993, Awona arrived in France at the age of six. She could have chosen to play for France internationally, and was a part of the France U19 team, but instead chose to represent Cameroon at senior level.

On 28 May 2015, Awona was selected in Cameroon's 23-player squad for 2015 FIFA Women's World Cup. After not playing the first two matches she made her FIFA Women's World Cup debut on 16 June 2015 in a 2–1 win against Switzerland in the last group stage match. She also started the next match in the Round of 16 against China.

References

External links 

 
 
 Player French football stats at footofeminin.fr 
 
 

1993 births
Living people
Women's association football defenders
Cameroonian women's footballers
Footballers from Yaoundé
Cameroon women's international footballers
2015 FIFA Women's World Cup players
2019 FIFA Women's World Cup players
Primera División (women) players
Madrid CFF players
Cameroonian expatriate women's footballers
Cameroonian expatriate sportspeople in Spain
Expatriate women's footballers in Spain
Cameroonian emigrants to France
Naturalized citizens of France
French women's footballers
Division 1 Féminine players
ASJ Soyaux-Charente players
S.S.D. Napoli Femminile players
S.C. Braga (women's football) players
French expatriate footballers
French expatriate sportspeople in Spain